Threemile Creek may refer to:

Threemile Creek (Licking River), a stream in Kentucky
Threemile Creek (Minnesota River), a stream in Minnesota
Threemile Creek (Missouri), a stream in Missouri
Threemile Creek (Hocking River), in Ohio

See also
Three Mile River